Brown Bag Films (BBF) is an Irish television CGI and computer animation production studio owned by Canadian production studio 9 Story Media Group and based in Dublin with 2D and 3D animation facilities based in Bali, Los Angeles, Toronto and formerly Manchester.

Founded in 1994 by Cathal Gaffney and Darragh O'Connell, the studio is well known for the production of CGI-animated and computer-animated television series and short films, including Give Up Yer Aul Sins and Granny O'Grimm's Sleeping Beauty. The studio has garnered a number of awards, including Academy Award nominations for Give Up Yer Aul Sins (Best Animated Short Film at the 73rd Academy Awards) and Granny O'Grimm's Sleeping Beauty (Best Animated Short Film at the 83rd Academy Awards), 6 Emmy Awards for Peter Rabbit, an Emmy award for Bing and a number of BAFTA, Emmy and Annie Award nominations for their shows; Octonauts, Doc McStuffins and Henry Hugglemonster.

Brown Bag Films have produced countless high-profile serial programming for various studios and television networks, including Bing for Cartoon Network and CBeebies  The Octonauts for CBeebies, Doc McStuffins, Vampirina and Henry Hugglemonster for Disney Junior, Peter Rabbit, Butterbean's Café and Nella the Princess Knight for Nick Jr., Chorion's Olivia for Nickelodeon, Wobbly Land for HIT Entertainment/Nickelodeon UK, animated teen drama Crap Rap for RTÉ and a remake of Enid Blyton's Noddy in Toyland for Chorion/Channel 5 UK.

As of   the studio has been at work on a computer-animated musical streaming television series, Karma's World, created by Chris "Ludacris" Bridges and inspired by his eldest daughter, Karma Bridges, which is currently airing/streaming on Netflix.

History

Independent era (1994–2015)
Brown Bag Films was established in 1994 by Cathal Gaffney and Darragh O'Connell, producing their first series 'Peig' for RTÉ using hand-painted acetate cels shot on 35mm film. In 1995, the studio moved to an old Georgian house off Gardiner Street, producing a few commercials and illustrations. Wolves, Witches and Giants was created in 1996 for ITV Studios.

The studio moved to a new premises in Dublin city centre in 1997, establishing Ireland's first digital ink-and-paint workstation. They worked on the Warner Bros feature film The King & I, coordinating European animation with LA via the a 56K modem. Barstool and Taxi were produced for RTÉ and they began to grow their commercials service.

In 1998, Brown Bag Films produced the series "Why?" for RTÉ which sold in over 100 countries worldwide.

In 1999, Brown Bag Films released their short film The Last Elk, directed by Alan Shannon. The film went on to win numerous international awards.

In 2002, Brown Bag Films was nominated for its first Oscar, Give Up Yer Aul Sins, directed by Gaffney and produced by O'Connell and the company grew to a staff of 22.

In July 2007, Brown Bag Films moved to a new studio in Smithfield Square, Dublin, designed by Douglas Wallace Architects, and began production on their first animated series, Olivia, for Nickelodeon. In the same year development began on Noddy in Toyland.

In 2008, the studio began working on Granny O'Grimm's Sleeping Beauty, directed by Nicky Phelan, landing a second Academy Award (Oscar) nomination.

In 2009, Brown Bag Films delivered 20 hours of animation to international broadcasters and was awarded European Producer of the Year at Cartoon Tributes, Norway. The studio has grown to more than 160 people and is equipped with a high-definition picture and 5:1 audio post production facility.

In July 2010, the company established an office in Los Angeles to produce animated feature films.

In 2011, they premièred Darragh O'Connell's short film, "23 Degrees, 5 Minutes", voiced by John Hurt. They began production on Doc McStuffins – the first show commissioned by newly re-branded Disney Junior which it would premiere on alongside Disney Channel. The Octonauts was nominated for a BAFTA award. Brown Bag Films began production on their own original series, Henry Hugglemonster, based on a book by Niamh Sharkey, for Disney Junior.

On 23 March 2012, the premiere of Doc McStuffins broke rating records for the most watched preschool premiere ever in the United States. Brown Bag Films continue production on it as well as Henry Hugglemonster following Disney Junior's announcement of their series renewals and a second season of the Octonauts, and are joined by a very special new staff member - Toby the Studio Dog!

In 2013, Brown Bag Films began production on a short film ANYA, made to raise awareness for the charity To Russia With Love. Brown Bag Films recruit 30 new staff and expand the studio into a third premises.

In February 2014, Brown Bag Films announced a television series adaptation of the Bing book series by author and illustrator Ted Dewan. Following series renewals by the host TV networks, they continued production on a second season of Henry Hugglemonster and Peter Rabbit, a third season of Doc McStuffins and a fourth season of The Octonauts. Brown Bag Films launched Brown Bag Labs, an online space for behind-the-scenes fun and tutorials from the studio. Octonauts was awarded with an IFTA for Best Children's Programme. ANYA was released online to raise funds for To Russia With Love charity. They announce the opening of their 2D studio in Manchester. Their short film An Ode To Love is awarded Best Irish Animation at Foyle Film Festival. They release the Christmas Special episode of their new online series Trouble In Paradise.

In January 2015, their pilot episode of The Stinky and Dirty Show, based on the 'I Stink!' book series by Kate and Jim McMullan, debuted on Amazon Prime (now Amazon Prime Video) and was later greenlit for a full series. Bing is awarded for Best Writing in a Children's TV Episode by The Writer's Guild of Great Britain. Doc McStuffins received an award for Outstanding Children's Program at the 46th NAACP Image Awards and a Peabody Award at the 74th Annual Peabody Awards.

9 Story Media Group subsidiary (2015–present)
Brown Bag Films was acquired by 9 Story Media Group on 18 August 2015 as a way of "re-introducing 3D and CGI animation to 9 Story" after "a failed first-attempt implementation", according to its president, Vincent "Vince" Commisso.  On 7 March 2016, they began work on a computer-animated series for Disney Junior, Vampirina, based on the Vampirina Ballerina series of children's books written by Anne Marie Pace and illustrated by LeUyen Pham which debuted on 1 October 2017.

In October 2017, more than two years after Brown Bag's acquisition, it became one of 9 Story's two main divisions alongside 9 Story Distribution International, taking over all 2D and 3D animation across 9 Story's studios in Dublin, Manchester and Toronto. 9 Story also renamed its two animation studios in Bali (formerly BASE Animation Studios) and its base in Toronto after Brown Bag Films.

Awards
At the 2014 Daytime Emmy Awards, Brown Bag Films bagged three awards and scored another five nominations for the series Peter Rabbit, earning the most nominations for an animated show that year.

On 31 March 2015 Brown Bag Films received nominations for both Peter Rabbit and Doc McStuffins announced at 42nd Daytime Emmy Awards. The Outstanding Individual Achievement Award in Animation had been awarded to Storyboard Artist Mårten Jönmark for Peter Rabbit for the second year in a row. Two further nominations have been received for Outstanding Directing in an Animated Program for Peter Rabbit and Outstanding Writing in a Preschool Animated Program for Doc McStuffins. Peter Rabbit has garnered 2 Parents Gold Choice Awards.

In June 2015, Doc McStuffins was awarded the Peabody Award for Children's Programming at the 74th Annual Peabody Awards, 3 NAACP Image Awards, 1 NAMIC Vision Award for Best Animation, 2 Young Artist Awards for Best Performance in a Voice-Over Role - Young Actor for Jaden Betts, Best Performance in a Voice-Over Role - Television - Young Actress for Caitlin Carmichael and 3 Sentinel Health Award wins. In 2013, for her role in the series, Loretta Devine scooped up 2 NAACP Image Awards for Outstanding Children's Program, Outstanding Character Voice-Over Performance and Outstanding Performance in a Youth/Children's Program - (Series or Special)
Bing was awarded Best Writing in a Children's TV Episode at a awards ceremony organnizeed by The Writers' Guild of Great Britain in 2014 and 2 Irish Animation Awards in 2015 – Best Design/Art Direction & Best Director of an Animated TV Series.

The Octonauts was awarded 1 IFTA award for Best Children's/Youth Programme in 2013. In 2015, Henry Hugglemonster was awarded an Irish Animation Award for Best Animated Preschool Series (up to 6 years) and ANYA received Best Overall Short Film and Best Sound at the Limerick Film Festival.

Granny O'Grimm's Sleeping Beauty received the following awards between 2009 and 2014:
Galway Film Fleadh, Ireland – Winner Best Animated Short
Palm Springs, California, U.S. – Runner up, Audience Choice Award
Denver Starz, U.S. – Winner, People's Choice Award
Dam Short Film Fest, U.S. – Runner-up, Audience Award
Irish Film & TV Awards, Ireland – Winner Best Animation
Omaha Film Festival, U.S. – Best Animated Short, Audience award
Heart of Gold, Australia – Winner, Best Comedy
Cinegael Montreal - Winner, Audience Award, Best Short
Newport Beach Film Festival - Winner, Outstanding Achievement in Short Films
Chicago Irish Film Festival - Audience Award, Best Short (2nd Place)
Cinegael Montreal, Canada - Audience Award, Best Short
Cineanima Short Film Festival, Portugal -  Special Mention, Best Short Film
Academy Awards® 2010 - Best Animated Short Film nomination
Cartoons on the Bay, Italy - Best Short Animation & Best Animated Character
Digital Media Awards, Ireland - Best Animation

The studio's first short film, Give Up Yer Aul Sins, received Best Animation at Galway Film Fleadh, Best Irish and Best International Animation at Cork Film Festival and Special Award for Original Idea at Cartoons on the Bay.

Contracted productions 
Brown Bag Films have produced and still produces countless TV series and short films including:
Robogobo (TBA), for Disney Junior; created by Chris Gilligan
Ladybird Lu (TBA), for Cartoonito. Series directed by Nicky Phelan
Eva the Owlet (2023), for Apple TV+.
Rosie's Rules (2022) for PBS Kids; created by Mariana Diaz-Wionczek.
Sago Mini Friends (2022), for Apple TV+; created by Chad Hicks
Eureka! (2022), for Disney Channel; created by Erica Rothschild.
Karma's World (2021), for Netflix; created by Chris Bridges.
Get Rolling with Otis (2021) for Apple TV+; created by Loren Long.
Ada Twist, Scientist (2021), for Netflix; created by Chris Nee.
Ridley Jones (2021), for Netflix; created by Chris Nee.
Powerbirds (2020). Co-production with Universal Kids.
Chico Bon Bon: Monkey with a Tool Belt (2020), for Netflix; created by Bob Boyle.
Clifford the Big Red Dog (2019–2021), for Amazon Prime Video and PBS Kids.
Blue's Clues & You! (2019–present), for Nickelodeon; Developed by Traci Paige Johnson and Angela C. Santomero
Xavier Riddle and the Secret Museum (2019–2022), for PBS Kids; created by Brad Meltzer.
Sadie Sparks (2019), for Disney Channel; created by Bronagh O'Hanlon.
Let's Go Luna! (2018–2022), for PBS Kids; created by Joe Murray
Butterbean's Café (2018–2020). Produced for Nickelodeon, who later moved it to sister channel Nick Jr.
Vampirina (2017–2021). For Disney Junior. Created by Chris Nee. Directed by Norton Virgien.
Nella the Princess Knight (2017–2021). Produced for Nickelodeon, who later moved it to sister channel Nick Jr.
The Stinky and Dirty Show (2015–2019). Produced for Amazon Prime Video.
Trouble in Paradise (2014–present). Online series created and directed by Shane Collins.
An Ode To Love (2014, 7.5 mins). Short film written and directed by Matthew Darragh.
Bing (2013–14, 78 x 7 mins) for CBeebies; directed by Nicky Phelan.
Anya (2013, 5 mins). Short film written and directed by Damien O'Connor in collaboration with To Russia With Love charity organisation.
Henry Hugglemonster (2013–2015, 52 x 11 mins) for Disney Junior, created by Niamh Sharkey and directed by Norton Virgien.
Peter Rabbit (2012, 52 x 11 mins & 2 x 22 mins) for Silvergate Media/BBC and Nickelodeon (US). Series directed by David McCamley.
Bird Food (2012, 5 mins). Short film written and directed by Richard Keane.
Doc McStuffins (2012–2020, 52 x 11 mins) for Disney Junior; created by Chris Nee, directed by Norton Virgien.
The Octonauts (Season 1, 2010, 52 X 11 mins and Season 2, 2012, 22 x 11 mins) for Silvergate Media/BBC, created by Meomi Design. Series 1 directed by Darragh O'Connell, series 2 directed by Nicky Phelan.
23 Degrees, 5 Minutes (2011, 10 mins), directed by Darragh O'Connell.
Noddy in Toyland (2009, 52 x 10 mins) for Chorion/FIVE UK; created by Enid Blyton. Series directed by David McCamley.
Olivia (Season 1, 2009, 52 x 10 mins and Season 2, 2010, 52 X 11 mins) for Chorion/Nickelodeon, created by Ian Falconer. Series 1 directed by Darragh O'Connell, series 2 directed by Tim Bjorklund.
 Granny O'Grimm's Sleeping Beauty (2008, 6 mins), directed by Nicky Phelan.
Grabby Bag (2007, 12 x 5 mins) for RTÉ, created and directed by David McCamley.
Teenology (2007, 30 × 1 mins) for RTÉ, created and directed by Bronagh O'Hanlon.
Wobbly Land (2007, 26 x 5 mins) for HIT Entertainment and Nickelodeon UK. Created and directed by Cat Little based on her student film.
Crap Rap (2007, 20 × 4 mins) for RTÉ, created and directed by Nicky Phelan.
I’m an Animal (2006, 52 × 2 mins) for RTÉ and the Irish Film Board.
Ding Dong Denny's A History of Ireland (2006–07, 5 mins). Short film directed by Cathal Gaffney.
Give Up Yer Aul Sins (2000, 6×5 mins, 1 X 26 mins) documentary for RTÉ/Irish Film Board, short film directed by Cathal Gaffney, series directed by Darragh O'Connell.
Why? (1998, 52×2 mins) for RTÉ.
The Last Elk (1998, 7 mins). Short film directed by Alan Shannon.
Barstool (1996, 7×4 mins) for RTÉ, created by Paul Young.
Peig (1994, 7×3 mins) for RTÉ, created by Cathal Gaffney and Darragh O'Connell.

Production studios
Brown Bag Films (Dublin):
Brown Bag Films (Manchester, closed)
Brown Bag Films (Toronto) (formerly 9 Story Toronto)
Brown Bag Films (Bali) (Formerly BASE animation studios)

See also
List of animation studios
Academy Award for Animated Short Film

References

External links

 

Crap Rap for RTÉ

Companies based in Dublin (city)
Mass media companies established in 1994
Irish companies established in 1994
Irish animation studios
2015 mergers and acquisitions
Irish subsidiaries of foreign companies